The Palazzo Marchetti is a Baroque-style palace located at Via Curtatone e Montanara  in central Pistoia, Tuscany, Italy. The palace, which once served as a civic art gallery, is used in 2019 as a civic archive for various family collections of documents.

Description
The design of the palace is attributed to Giovanni Battista Baldi, under the patronage of the cavaliere Orazio Marchetti, who purchased the property in the 1650s from the Cellesi family, and joined it to adjacent properties. The interiors were frescoed by Giovanni Domenico Ferretti. At one time, the palace held a prized art collection. This was the home where the astronomer Angelo Marchetti was born. A 17th-century bishop of Arezzo, Giovanni Matteo Marchetti, was also from this family.

References

Houses completed in the 17th century
Palaces in Pistoia